The Federation of Protestant Welfare Agencies (FPWA) is a social services institution in United States of America. Since its inception in 1922, FPWA has sought to promote the social and economic well-being of greater New York’s most vulnerable Protestants by strengthening human service organizations and advocating for just public policies.  Its first permanent home was the Church Missions House, a historic landmark located at 281 Park Avenue. In May 2015, FPWA moved its office and conference center to 40 Broad Street where it occupies the 5th Floor of the mixed use building.

History
FPWA was originally named the Federation of Institutions Caring for Protestant Children. It was founded in response to a request in 1920 from the Commissioner of the New York City Department of Public Welfare, seeking representatives of religious social welfare organizations to form an advisory committee across the country. In the 1930s the organization changed its name to the Federation of Protestant Welfare Agencies, seeking to increase access to needed services and expand its programs and services. FPWA bought the Church Missions House in 1963. In 2015, the organization underwent a re-branding and officially goes by the acronym, FPWA.

FPWA exists today with a membership of almost 200 social service agencies and churches all over the country. Its policy efforts focus on issues of income security, child welfare, childcare and education, elderly welfare, workforce development, youth services, HIV and AIDS, and offers scholarship programs and emergency financial assistance. In addition, in 2007 it was among over 530 New York City arts and social service institutions to receive part of a $30 million grant from the Carnegie Corporation, which was made possible through a donation by New York City mayor Michael Bloomberg.

The current CEO is a child and family advocate, Jennifer Jones Austin.

References
Notes

Bibliography
Bernstein, Nina. The Lost Children of Wilder: The Epic Struggle to Change Foster Care. New York: Pantheon Books, 2001
Harris, Bill. The Sidewalks of New York: A Celebration of New York History Heritage Media Corp., 1999

External links
Federation of Protestant Welfare Agencies homepage
Carnegie Corporation homepage 

82nd Street Academics
ACRIA
AIDS Service Center NYC 
ARC XVI - Fort Washington
Abbott House
Adolescent & Family Comprehensive Services
Aging in America Community Services
Albert G. Oliver Program
Amistad Early Childhood Education Center
Andrew Glover Youth Program (AGYP)
Anna Lefkowitz Day Care Center
Argus Community
Bailey House
Barrier Free Living
Berkshire Farm Center & Services for Youth
Betances Health Center
Big Brothers/Big Sisters Inc. of NYC
Black Veterans for Social Justice
Bronx Bethany Church of the Nazarene
Bronxdale Tenants League Day Care Center
Brooklyn Kindergarten Society
Caribbean Women's Health Association
Caring Community
Carter Burden Center for the Aging
Center Against Domestic Violence
Chapin Home for the Aging
Children's Village
Chinese American Planning Council
Christian Herald Association
Church of the Epiphany
Claremont Neighborhood Centers
Clergy United for Community Empowerment
Co-op City Baptist Church
Community Healthcare Network
Danish Home for the Aged
Day Care Council of New York
East Harlem Neighborhood Based Alliance Corp.
East Harlem Tutorial Program
East Side Community Group for Senior Services
Side House Settlement
Economic Opportunity Commission of Nassau County
Gould Services for Children
Elders Share the Arts
Episcopal Community Services of Long Island
Episcopal Social Services
Exodus Transitional Community
Forestdale
Fort Greene Senior Citizens Council
GO Project
Getting Out and Staying Out
Girls Quest
Goddard-Riverside Community Center
Grace Church Community Center
Grace Episcopal Church, West Farms
Graham-Windham Services to Families and Children
Greater Allen Cathedral of N.Y.
Green Chimneys Children's Services
Greenhope Services for Women
Hamilton-Madison House
Harlem Dowling-Westside Center for Families & Children
Harlem RBI
Harlem United: Community AIDS Center
Hartley House
Heights & Hill Community Council
Henry Street Settlement
Highbridge Advisory Council
Holy Trinity Neighborhood Center
Home Care Council of New York City
Homecrest Community Services
Housing + Solutions
Hudson Guild
Incarnation Center
Institute for the Puerto Rican & Hispanic Elderly
Inwood House
Isabella Geriatric Center
Jacob A. Riis Neighborhood Settlement
Jamaica Service Program For Older Adults
Korean Community Services of Metropolitan New York, Inc. (KCS)
Leake & Watts Services
Lenox Hill Neighborhood House
Lincoln Square Neighborhood Center
Lower East Side Family Union
Lutheran Social Services Metropolitan NY
Memorial Baptist Church
Momentum AIDS Project
Mount Hope Housing Company
Mt. Tremper Outdoor Ministries
Muslim Women's Institute for Research and Development
National Federation of Community Development Credit Unions
Neighborhood Initiatives Development Corp.
New Alternatives for Children
New York Armenian Home
New York Asian Women's Center
New York City Mission Society
New York Therapeutic Communities-Stay 'N Out
New York Youth at Risk
Northside Center for Child Development
Older Adults Technological Services/ OATS
One Stop Senior Services
Park Avenue Christian Church (Disciples of Christ)
Park Slope Geriatric Day Center
Partnership with Children
Penington Friends House
Phipps Community Development Corporation
Pleasant Avenue Day Care Center
Presbyterian Senior Services
Project FIND
Queensbridge Day Care Center
Reality House
Riverstone Senior Life Services
SCAN New York
SCO Family of Services 
STRIVE/East Harlem Employment Services
Saint Luke's Lutheran Church
Salvation Army
Seafarers & International House
Search and Care
Service Program for Older People, Inc.
Southeast Bronx Neighborhood Center
St. Christopher's
Stanley M. Isaacs Neighborhood Center
Staten Island Mental Health Society
Steinway Child & Family Services
Sunnyside Community Services
Swiss Benevolent Society of NY
The Brotherhood-Sister Sol
The Cathedral Church of St. John the Divine - Cathedral Community Cares
The Christian Learning Day Care, Inc.
The Family Center
The Hope Program
Trail Blazer Camps
Trinity Wall Street
Union Settlement Association
United Community Centers
United Methodist City Society
University Settlement Society of New York
Visiting Neighbors
Westchester Tremont Day Care Center
Women's City Club of New York
Women's Prison Association and Home
YMCA of Greater New York
YWCA of Brooklyn
YWCA of Yonkers
YWCA of the City of New York

Charities based in New York City
Christian charities based in the United States